Lost in Africa is a 1994 film directed by Stewart Raffill. It stars Jennifer McComb and Ashley Hamilton.

Cast
Jennifer McComb as Elizabeth
Ashley Hamilton as Michael 
Mohamed Nangurai as Rabar
Timothy Ackroyd as Charles
J. Jay Saunders as Daryl

References

External links

1994 films
Films directed by Stewart Raffill
1990s English-language films